Eveline Vanhyfte (born 19 March 1984) is a Belgian former professional tennis player.

Biography
Vanhyfte began competing professionally in 2001 and won her only ITF singles title in 2003, at Heerhugowaard.

As a doubles player, she won four titles on the ITF Circuit, all partnering Leslie Butkiewicz. She formed a wildcard pairing with Butkiewicz in the doubles event at the Hasselt Cup in 2004, which was her only WTA Tour main-draw appearance.

In both 2004 and 2005, Vanhyfte featured in the Belgium Fed Cup squad. Not used in 2004, her opportunity came when an understrength Belgium faced the United States in the 2005 World Group quarter-final, held in Delray Beach. Ranked 392 in the world at the time, she was beaten in the singles by the world No. 1, Lindsay Davenport, in a one-sided 39 minute match. She also played in the doubles rubber with Kirsten Flipkens.

ITF Circuit finals

Singles: 2 (1–1)

Doubles: 6 (4–2)

References

External links
 
 
 

1984 births
Living people
Belgian female tennis players
21st-century Belgian women